Selo pri Kostelu is a small settlement west of Kostel in southern Slovenia. It lies in the traditional region of Lower Carniola and is now included in the Southeast Slovenia Statistical Region.

Name
The name of the settlement was changed from Selo to Selo pri Kostelu in 1953.

References

External links
Selo pri Kostelu on Geopedia

Populated places in the Municipality of Kostel